Ebilassokro is a town in eastern Ivory Coast. It is a sub-prefecture of Abengourou Department in Indénié-Djuablin Region, Comoé District.

Ebilassokro was a commune until March 2012, when it became one of 1126 communes nationwide that were abolished.

In 2021, the population of the sub-prefecture of Ebilassokro was 28,331.

Villages
The three villages of the sub-prefecture of Ebilassokro and their population in 2014 are:
 Ebilassokro  (14 295)  
 Akati  (4 343)  
 Kouamétiémelekro (795)

References

Sub-prefectures of Indénié-Djuablin
Former communes of Ivory Coast